Pete Lesperance is a Canadian guitarist, singer, songwriter, and producer best known as the lead guitarist for the Canadian hard rock band Harem Scarem.  Lesperance was born October 13, 1968, in Scarborough, Ontario.  Lesperance was a guitarist in the Oshawa metal band Minotaur before forming Harem Scarem with Blind Vengeance vocalist Harry Hess in 1987.

Lesperance's solo album, Down In It, was released in 2004 in Japan only, where Harem Scarem had their main fanbase. With fellow guitarist Mike Turner (ex-Our Lady Peace), they put together the band Fair Ground.  Together they released a new version of Down In It.

Lesperance's own studio, Hope Songs, is located in Toronto, Ontario.  Lesperance has produced many bands, including the rock band One Short.  He is currently finishing up albums for Canadian Idol contestants Aaron Walpole and Suzi Rawn.

His influences include Eddie Van Halen, Brian May, Nuno Bettencourt and Steve Vai.

Discography

With Minotaur
83-87 (EP) (2004) -material was recorded in the early 80s

With Harem Scarem
Harem Scarem (1991)
Mood Swings (1993)
Voice of Reason (1995)
Karma Cleansing (1997)
Big Bang Theory (1998)
Weight of the World (2002)
Higher (2003)
Overload (2005)
Human Nature (2006)
Hope (2008)
Mood Swings II (2013)
Thirteen (2014)
United (2017)
Change The World (2020)

With Rubber
Rubber (1999)
Ultra Feel (2001)

Solo
Down In It (2004)
Fade Into Stars (2012)

Fair Ground

Fair Ground was an alternative rock collaboration formed by Pete Lesperance and Mike Turner (Our Lady Peace). Originally Turner was to make a guest appearance on Lesperance's solo album, but this developed into Fair Ground's only album, Down In It, which was released on November 6, 2006. Following an internet poll the group released the song "Down In It" as a single. This was followed by "Boy Without A Clue".

Down In It (2006). Track listing:
 "Down In It" - 3:40
 "Automatic" - 3:25
 "Say You Will" - 3:33
 "Nameless" - 3:33
 "What are you Waiting For?" - 3:20
 "Boy Without a Clue" - 4:03
 "Skeleton Tree" - 3:47
 "No Sign of Life" - 3:45
 "Upside Down" - 3:37
 "Life Goes On" - 3:17
 "Life Goes On" (Acoustic Bonus Track) - 3:31

Guest Appearances/Collaborations
Doctor Rock & The Wild Bunch - Eye of the Hurricane (1991) - Guitars
Doctor Rock & The Wild Bunch - Stark Raving Mad (1994) - Guitars
Honeymoon Suite - 13 Live (1994) - Engineer, Mixer
Mystery - Backwards (1995) - Producer (with Harry Hess)
Lame - Ol' Doctor Bomb (1996) - Producer (With Harry Hess)
Fall From Grace - Within The Savage Garden (1997) - Guitar Technician
Steve Holliday - Stark Raving Mad (1997) - Guitars
Xntrik - Focus (1997) - Guitar Technician
Fiore - Body Electric (1998) - Producer
Fiore - Today Till' Tomorrow (1998) - Producer (With Harry Hess)
Rafa Martin - Corazon De Hierro (2000) - Guitars
Stupid Angel - Stupid Angel (2000) - Producer (With Harry Hess)
John Boswell - Stranger In The Mirror (2002) - Guitars
Ken Tamplin - Wake The Nations (2003) - Guitars
Maureen Leeson - aka MOE (2003) - Guitars
Billy Klippert - Billy Klippert (2004) - Composer, Guitars
Brian Tulk - The Pop Machine (2004) - Guitars
Brian Tulk - Paperweight (2007) - Guitars
John Grolman - Existence (2009) - Guitars, Backing Vocals
LORD - Set in Stone (2009) - Guest guitar solo: Track 11: "New Horizons"
Liberty N' Justice - Light It Up (2010) - Guitars, Backing Vocals: Track 11: "Beautiful Decision"

References

External links 
  Official Site
  Official Harem Scarem Site
  Minotaur Myspace
 [ Down In It]
 My Remote Producer

1968 births
Canadian rock guitarists
Canadian male guitarists
Living people
People from Scarborough, Toronto
Musicians from Toronto